4th Missouri Infantry can refer to:

 4th Missouri Infantry Regiment (Confederate)
 4th Missouri Infantry Regiment (Union, 3 months), a unit that existed in 1861
 4th Missouri Infantry Regiment (Union, 3 years), a unit that existed 1862–1863

See also
 1st and 4th Missouri Infantry Regiment (Consolidated)